Russian Journal may refer to one of the following

A Russian Journal, a 1948 book by John Steinbeck 
Russian Journal, a 1981 book by Andrea Lee
Russian Journal (website), a Russian online publication

See also